Sthembiso Ngcobo (born 24 September 1983 in Durban, KwaZulu-Natal) is a South African association football striker for Premier Soccer League club Free State Stars.

Career
He signed for promotion gaining Free State Stars before the start of the 2007–08 Premier Soccer League season from National First Division side Durban Stars. His first season in the top flight was a huge success with him gaining a call up to the national squad. He moved to Kaizer Chiefs for the 2010–11 Premier Soccer League.

International goals

External links
 

Living people
1983 births
South African soccer players
South Africa international soccer players
Association football forwards
Durban Stars F.C. players
Free State Stars F.C. players
Kaizer Chiefs F.C. players
AmaZulu F.C. players
Bidvest Wits F.C. players
South African Premier Division players
National First Division players
Sportspeople from Durban